Spankey (also Clendenin) is an unincorporated community in Jersey County, Illinois, United States. It is located about two miles east of the Illinois River.

References

Unincorporated communities in Illinois
Unincorporated communities in Jersey County, Illinois